HM Prison Peterborough is a Category B private prison for men, and a closed prison for women and female young offenders, located in Peterborough, Cambridgeshire, England. The prison is operated by Sodexo Justice Services, and is the only dual purpose-built prison holding males and females in the United Kingdom. The prison, which has a population of 320 inmates, comprises four large wings, each with a separate housing arrangement for female detainees and male detainees. It is managed by the Newton Secure Training Centre (NSTC), and the associated training centre, which operates under Sodexo Services, comprises 26 housing units, ranging from 12-storey purpose built units to 10-storey semiprivate accommodation units.

History
HMP Peterborough was built on the site of the former Baker Perkins engineering works. The prison opened in 2005, despite a great deal of protest from local residents. The Prison Service claimed at the time that Peterborough as a 'mixed-use' prison would become a blueprint for the prisons of the future. Peterborough Prison was soon involved in controversy however, when the jail advertised to recruit 2 holistic therapists to offer reflexology, aromatherapy and Indian head massages to inmates. The MP for Peterborough, Stewart Jackson accused the prison of pampering inmates and sending out the wrong message to hard-working families.

In January 2008, a national table of prisons compiled by the Prison Service revealed that Peterborough Prison had come last out of 132 prisons and prison clusters, with low marks for reducing re-offending, organisational effectiveness and decency. A month later, women prisoners at Peterborough complained that the food served at the jail was too high in calories, and made them put on weight. Officials at the prison claimed that healthy options were always available for inmates at mealtimes.

In January 2013, the Ministry of Justice announced that an additional houseblock will be constructed at Peterborough Prison, increasing the overall capacity of the jail.

The prison was the scene of an incident involving a Royal Air Force bomb disposal team on 13 April 2018, which deployed a bomb disposal robot to remotely interact with a silver Volkswagen Golf at the prison. Authorities revealed the following day they had been responding to a reported bomb in the car but this proved incorrect.

Notable inmates
Rekha Kumari-Baker, woman who stabbed to death her own two children in 2007
Emma Tustin, woman convicted of torturing and murdering her step-son in June 2020. Sentenced in 2021.

References

External links
 Ministry of Justice pages on Peterborough
 Sodexo Justice Services page on Peterborough

Prisons in Cambridgeshire
Category B prisons in England
Women's prisons in England
Buildings and structures in Peterborough
2005 establishments in England
Private prisons in the United Kingdom
Sodexo Justice Services